Salinas is a city and resort of the Costa de Oro in the Canelones Department of southern Uruguay.

Salinas is also the name of the municipality to which the town belongs and which includes the resort towns Marindia, Pinamar–Pinepark, Neptunia and rural areas to their north.

Geography
The city is located on Km.39 of Ruta Interbalnearia, and at its intersection with Route 87. It borders the resorts Pinamar-Pinepark to the west and Marindia to the east.

History
On 1 July 1982, its status was elevated from "Balneario" (resort) to "Ciudad" (city) by the Act of Ley Nº 15.283.

Population
According to the 2011 census, Salinas had a population of 8,626. In 2010 the Intendencia de Canelones had estimated a population of 16,874 for the municipality during the elections.
 
Source: Instituto Nacional de Estadística de Uruguay

Places of worship
 St. Elizabeth of Hungary Parish Church (Roman Catholic)

References

External links

INE map of Salinas, Pinemar-Pinepark, Marindia, Neptunia and Villa Juana

Populated places in the Canelones Department
Seaside resorts in Uruguay